Johann Cramer may refer to:

 Johann Ulrich von Cramer (1706–1772), German judge, legal scholar, and Enlightenment philosopher
 Johann Baptist Cramer (1771–1858), German composer
 Johann Cramer (politician) (1905–1987), German SPD politician

See also
John Cramer (disambiguation)